Thiago Seyboth Wild (born 10 March 2000) is a Brazilian tennis player. He won 2018 US Open junior singles title. He reached a career high ATP singles ranking of No. 106 on 14 September 2020 and a doubles ranking of No. 230 achieved on 20 March 2023. He had a career high ITF junior ranking of No. 8 achieved on 22 January 2018.

Seyboth Wild made his ATP main draw debut at the 2018 Brasil Open after receiving a wildcard into the singles main draw.

He won his first Challenger title at Guayaquil defeating Bolivian Hugo Dellien on November 3, 2019.

At just 19 years old, he won his first ATP Tour title in Santiago defeating Norwegian Casper Ruud on 1 March 2020. By winning this title he became the youngest Brazilian ever to win an ATP title. He also became the first player on the ATP Tour born in or beyond the year 2000 to win a non-exhibition ATP title.

Career

2018: Junior Grand Slam title
Wild became the second Brazilian to win a junior Grand Slam (US Open) on September 9, joining Tiago Fernandes. He also made the junior semifinal at the Roland Garros, and at the doubles of US Open and French Open.

2019: First Challenger title
In November 2019, at the age of 19, he won his first Challenger in Guayaquil, entering the top 300 in the world for the first time. With the title, he jumped to the 235th place in the world ranking, and became the third best tennis player in Brazil at the moment, behind only Thiago Monteiro and João Menezes.

2020: Two wildcards and first ATP 250 title

In February 2020, he received wildcard to participate in the ATP 500 in Rio de Janeiro, where he defeated the Spaniard top 100 Alejandro Davidovich Fokina in three sets (5–7, 7–6 (7–3) and 7–5) in the first round, in the longest match in the history of the tournament (3 hours and 49 minutes). In the next round, he faced world number 32 Borna Ćorić, losing in the third set tiebreak. With this result, he entered the world top 200 for the first time on February 24, moving up to ranking No. 182.

In the following week, invited as a wildcard to the ATP 250 in Santiago, Wild had his best campaign: he defeated Facundo Bagnis, Juan Ignacio Londero (world No. 63) and in the quarterfinals, the top seed of the tournament, and champion of the Rio Open, the Chilean Cristian Garín, ranking No. 18, who retired after losing the first set in a tiebreak. In the semifinals he defeated Renzo Olivo in straight sets becoming the youngest Brazilian to reach a final at this level, surpassing the achievements of former world number 1 Gustavo Kuerten, then aged 20, and of Jaime Oncins and Thomaz Bellucci, at 21 years old. He also became the first Brazilian to compete in an ATP level final since Bellucci was runner-up in Houston in April 2017. In the final, he defeated Norwegian Casper Ruud (ranked No. 38 and champion of the Argentina Open two weeks before), in three sets, becoming champion at 19 years old, surpassing Kuerten, who won his first ATP title at the age of 20. Wild is also the youngest tennis player to win a title in the Latin American clay court since Rafael Nadal won Acapulco in 2005, at the age of 18. Wild climbed up 69 positions, reaching a career high ATP singles ranking of No. 113, becoming the second-highest ranked tennis player in Brazil.

In March, Seyboth Wild became the first professional tennis player to announce a diagnosis of COVID-19. He was investigated for an alleged breach of quarantine prior to receiving the test results.

After the season was stopped for a few months due to the COVID-19 pandemic. In September, Seyboth Wild participated in the  Challenger 125 in Aix-en-Provence, France, reaching the final.

2023: Maiden doubles final, Second Challenger title 
After two years of having poor results, in March, Wild reached the final of the Challenger in Santiago, losing to Hugo Dellien, and the following week, he won the Challenger in Vina del Mar, defeating top seed Hugo Gaston and returning to the top 230 in the singles rankings on 20 March 2023.

He also reached the doubles final at the 2023 Chile Open partnering Matías Soto. As a result he reached a new career career doubles ranking of No. 234 on 6 March 2023.

Personal life
In September 2021, it was announced that Brazilian authorities were investigating allegations of domestic violence perpetrated by Seyboth Wild against his ex-girlfriend.

ATP career finals

Singles: 1 (1 title)

Doubles: 1 (1 runner-up)

ATP Challenger Tour and ITF Futures/World Tennis Tour Finals

Singles: 8 (5 titles, 4 runner-ups)

Doubles: 5 (3 titles, 2 runner up)

Junior Grand Slam finals

Singles: 1 (1 title)

Record against top 10 players
Seyboth Wild's record against players who have been ranked in the top 10, with those who are active in boldface. Only ATP Tour main draw matches are considered:

References

External links
 
 

2000 births
Living people
Brazilian male tennis players
Sportspeople from Paraná (state)
Grand Slam (tennis) champions in boys' singles
US Open (tennis) junior champions
Tennis players at the 2019 Pan American Games
Pan American Games competitors for Brazil
21st-century Brazilian people